Filipp Feodosyevich Zhmachenko (– 19 June 1966) was a Soviet Army colonel general and Hero of the Soviet Union.

Biography 
Zhmachenko was born on 26 November 1895 to a Ukrainian peasant family in the village of Mogilno, Ovruchsky Uyezd in the Volhynian Governorate. After graduating from the village school in 1906, he became a railway repair worker.  

He participated in the First World War and the Russian Civil War. In 1937-1938, he was commander of the 92nd Rifle Division, until he was arrested in June 1938. He remained in custody until July 1939.
He was restored in the Red Army and in November 1939, he was appointed chief of staff of the Kharkov Military District. Since March 1941, he was the commander of the 67th Rifle Corps. 

After the start of Operation Barbarossa, the 67th Rifle Corps became in July 1941 part of the 21st Army of the Western Front and under the command of Zhmachenko, participated in the Battle of Babruysk during the Battle of Smolensk. In mid-July 1941, he was replaced as commander by Kuzma Galitsky. He then received command of the 42nd Rifle Division, but was wounded and out of action until September 1941.

From September 1941 he was Deputy Commander of the 38th Army of the Southwestern Front. In February-May 1942, he became commander of the 3rd Army of the Bryansk Front. In September 1943 he was appointed commander of the 47th Army of the Voronezh Front.

From October 1943 until the end of the war, he commanded the 40th Army. With his army, he fought in the Battle of Kiev (1943), Dnieper–Carpathian Offensive, Second Jassy–Kishinev Offensive, Bucharest-Arad Offensive, Battle of Debrecen, Siege of Budapest, Banská Bystrica and Bratislava–Brno Offensive, Prague Offensive, and the capture of Romania, Hungary and Czechoslovakia. 

In October 1943, Zhmachenko was awarded the title Hero of the Soviet Union for crossing the Dnieper River and holding the bridgehead south of Kiev. 

He was promoted to the rank of colonel general on 29 May 1945. After the war, he was appointed deputy commander of the Central Group of Forces in Austria. Since 1949, he was the deputy commander of the Belarusian Military District and in November 1953 of the Carpathian Military District. In 1955-1960, he was Chairman of the Central Committee of the DOSAAF of the Ukrainian SSR.

He retired in 1960 and died in Kiev on 19 June 1966. A street in the city was named after him.

References

Citations

Bibliography

Sources
 Generals.dk 
 the article in the Russian Wikipedia, Жмаченко, Филипп Феодосьевич.

1895 births
1966 deaths
Soviet colonel generals
Russian military personnel of World War I
Soviet military personnel of World War II
Russian people of World War II
People from Volhynian Governorate
Heroes of the Soviet Union
Recipients of the Order of Lenin
Recipients of the Order of the Red Banner
Recipients of the Order of Suvorov, 1st class
Recipients of the Order of Kutuzov, 1st class
Recipients of the Order of Bogdan Khmelnitsky (Soviet Union), 1st class
Commanders of the Legion of Merit
Recipients of the Military Order of the White Lion
Burials at Baikove Cemetery
Soviet military personnel of the Russian Civil War
Second convocation members of the Supreme Soviet of the Soviet Union
People from Zhytomyr Oblast